Her Younger Sister is a 1914 American silent short drama film directed by Frank Cooley starring Fred Gamble and Charlotte Burton.

Cast
 Fred Gamble as Billly Lyons
 Charlotte Burton as Elsie Lyons (age 20)
 Gladys Kingsbury as Emma Lyons
 Kathie Fisher as Elsie Lyons (age 10)
 Joseph Harris as John Wyman

External links

1914 films
1914 drama films
Silent American drama films
American silent short films
American black-and-white films
1914 short films
1910s American films